The New Zealand Listener Power List is a list of the most powerful people in New Zealand, compiled annually by the New Zealand Listener from 2004 to 2009. From 2004 to 2007, the list covered the 50 most powerful people without separating them by field. In 2008, the list was divided into the top ten most powerful, and ten lists of five or six people each in specific fields.

Power List

Divisions

Business and economy

Māoridom

Government and law

Primary sector

Health, education and social issues

Culture

Science and technology

Media

Environment

Sport

Notes

References

External links
2004 Power List
2005 Power List
2006 Power List
2007 Power List
2008 Power List
2009 Power List

Listener Power List
Works originally published in New Zealand Listener